This list is a part of the international List of Gothic brick buildings.
For the parts of this list on the various countries see:

– In long tables, vertical arrows link to the navigation boards above (after the preceding table) and below (before the next table). –

Saxony

Saxony-Anhalt

Brandenburg and Berlin

Mecklenburg-Vorpommern

–Database links:
D-NO = Dehio List of Monuments 1906 – Northeast of that time German Empire (in German), digital Library of Heidelberg University–

The distinction between Mecklenburg and Vorpommern (Hither Pomerania) follows the historical borders, the borders of presentday districts do not. Therefore, the list of Mecklenburg shows some buildings in Vorpommern-Rügen district, and the list of Hither Pomerania without Rügen shows some buildings in Mecklenburgische Seenplatte district.

Mecklenburg

Rügen island

Hither Pomerania without Rügen

Schleswig-Holstein and Hamburg

Lower Saxony and Bremen

North Rhine-Westphalia

In North Rhine-Westphalia, Brick Gothic is concentrated west of the Rhine north of Bonn and in western Münsterland. The regional style, including the colour of the bricks (very dark or very pale, but seldom very red), is very similar to neighbouring regions of the Netherlands – the present day border, three miles east of the Meuse, is as young as from 1815.

See the location map, placed between the lists of Münster region and of northern Rhine region.

East-Westphalia

Münster region

Northern Rhineland

Baden-Württemberg 

‚

Bavaria 
Database information on listed cultural heritage monuments in Bavaria are available from the Bayerischer Denkmal-Atlas. The informations are presented, if you click on the building in the map. The search function of this atlas does not work by the object numbers, but by addresses. Therefore, in this list, after the number of the dossier, street names and house numbers are noted, which have to be copied into the search form, together with the place name.

Bibliography 
 Hans Josef Böker: Die mittelalterliche Backsteinarchitektur Norddeutschlands. Darmstadt 1988. 
 Gerhard Vinken (ed.): Georg Dehio Handbuch der deutschen Kunstdenkmäler. Brandenburg. München 20o12.  The descriptions of the single buildings are also available online from the cultural heritage database of the state of Brandenburg.
 Hans-Christian Feldmann (ed.): Handbuch der deutschen Kunstdenkmäler. Mecklenburg-Vorpommern. München 2000. 
 Johannes Habich (ed.): Georg Dehio Handbuch der deutschen Kunstdenkmäler. Hamburg und Schleswig-Holstein. München 2009. 
 Gerd Weiß  (ed.): Georg Dehio Handbuch der deutschen Kunstdenkmäler. Bremen und Niedersachsen. München 1992. 
 Claudia Euskirchen & al.: Georg Dehio: Handbuch der deutschen Kunstdenkmäler. Nordrhein-Westfalen I. Rheinland. 2005, .
 Ursula Quednau & al.: Georg Dehio: Handbuch der deutschen Kunstdenkmäler. Nordrhein-Westfalen II. Westfalen. 2016, .
 Georg Dehio: Handbuch der deutschen Kunstdenkmäler. Band 1: Mitteldeutschland. Berlin, 1905 (digitized see digi.ub.uni-heidelberg.de Digitalisat).
 Georg Dehio: Handbuch der deutschen Kunstdenkmäler. Band 2: Nordostdeutschland. Berlin, 1906 (digitized see digi.ub.uni-heidelberg.de Digitalisat).
 Georg Dehio: Handbuch der deutschen Kunstdenkmäler. Band 5: Nordwestdeutschland. Berlin, 1912 (digitized see digi.ub.uni-heidelberg.de).

References 

Germany
Gothic architecture in Germany
Lists of buildings and structures in Germany